Octopodiformes is a superorder of the subclass Coleoidea, comprising the octopuses and the vampire squid. All living members of Octopodiformes have eight arms, either lacking the two tentacles of squid (as is the case in octopuses) or modifying the tentacles into thin filaments (as in vampire squid). Octopodiformes is often considered the crown group of octopuses and vampire squids, including all descendants of their common ancestor. Some authors use the term Vampyropoda for the same general category, though others use "Vampyropoda" to refer to the total group (all cephalopods closer to octopods than to true squid). Another term is Octobranchia, referring to cephalopods without prominent tentacles.

Pohlsepia, originally described as earliest octopod is considered as dubious for this group in later study. The oldest unambiguous vampyropod is Syllipsimopodi, a squid-like cephalopod from the Mississippian-age Bear Gulch Lagerstätte of Montana. Syllipsimopodi has a combination of squid-like features (like 10 arms) and octopod-like features (like biserial suckers and a simplified internal shell).

Classification
Class Cephalopoda
Subclass Nautiloidea: nautilus
Subclass †Ammonoidea: ammonites
Subclass Coleoidea
Superorder Decapodiformes: squid, cuttlefish
Clade Vampyropoda
Genus †Syllipsimopodi
Genus †Proteroctopus
Superorder Octopodiformes / Octobranchia
Family †Trachyteuthididae (incertae sedis)
Order Vampyromorphida: vampire squid
Clade: Muensterelloidea
Family: †Muensterellidae
Family: †Patelloctopodidae
Order Octopoda
 Genus †Keuppia (incertae sedis)
 Genus †Palaeoctopus (incertae sedis)
 Genus †Paleocirroteuthis (incertae sedis)
 Genus †Proteroctopus (incertae sedis)
 Genus †Styletoctopus (incertae sedis)
Suborder Cirrina: finned deep-sea octopus
Family Opisthoteuthidae: umbrella octopus
Family Cirroteuthidae
Family Stauroteuthidae
Suborder Incirrina
Family Amphitretidae: telescope octopus
Family Bolitaenidae: gelatinous octopus
Family Octopodidae: benthic octopus
Family Vitreledonellidae: glass octopus
Superfamily Argonautoidea
Family Alloposidae: seven-arm octopus
Family Argonautidae: argonauts
Family Ocythoidae: tuberculate pelagic octopus
Family Tremoctopodidae: blanket octopus

References

External links

 Tree of Life web project: Octopodiformes

 
Protostome superorders
Extant Pennsylvanian first appearances